Oru Oorla Oru Rajakumari (  A Princess in a town) is an Indian Tamil-language family soap opera on Zee Tamil and on their ZEE5 platform from 23 April 2018. It stars Ashwini and Puvi Arasu in the lead roles.

The story concerns a young, overweight girl, Rasathi (Ashwini), who battles against body shaming. The plot of the story is taken from the Badho Bahu serial, which airs on &TV.

Due to unavoidable circumstances, the series was discontinued until its second season Oru Oorla Rendu Rajakumari ( Two princess in a Town) premiered on 25 October 2021.

Plot
Rasathi is a 'plump' girl who faces prejudice due to her size. Rasathi is a single-parent's child. So, her mother Shenbakavalli and their family along with Rasathi father's friend Paarivendan and family has taken the initiative for Rasathi's marriage since she is the daughter of Paarivendan's friend also Rasathi's family have not enough property to arrange the marriage. Paarivendan fixes a man named Shankar for Rasathi, who is already married and has a child. During the wedding, Shankar stops the ceremony. It's because of Paarivendan, who had a problem with Shankar two days before the wedding. Thus Shankar had planned to take revenge against Paarivendan during the ceremony5a. After Shankar leaves from there, Rasathi becomes worried. Paarivendan realizes that it's because of him the marriage has stopped, so he promises Shenbakavalli that his son Iniyan – the village's best Kabaddi player – will marry Rasathi. Iniyan initially rejects this marriage as he loves another girl, but his father compels him to accept and marry Rasathi. In Iniyan's house, everyone except Paarivendan, paternal uncle Nesamani and cousin brother Kumaran, hates Rasathi. Firstly Iniyan's paternal aunt Maragatham, the head of Iniyan's family, hates Rasathi because of her appearance and her belonging to a middle-class family. Secondly Maragatham's son Kumaran married Rasathi's classmate, Kanmani – a greedy, well-settled and angry girl. She initially loves Iniyan and wishes to marry him but her plan fails because of Rasathi marries Iniyan. So Kanmani decides to take revenge against Rasathi thus marries Kumaran and enters as sister-in-law of Iniyan. Also after some days Kanmani makes Maragatham as an interloper toy to her. Iniyan's mother Mangai initially dislikes Rasathi but seeing her co-sister Maragatham always appreciate her own daughter-in-law Kanmani but criticize Rasathi, Mangai starts to take care of Rasathi. Day-by-day Kanmani gives plans to Maragatham for Rasathi to get stress and tension always. Rasathi needs to overcome the problems which are raised by them.

Iniyan keeps refusing Rasathi and he doesn't allow her to sleep with him. Also Kanmani and Maragatham make them separate. Mangai learns about this and decides to unite them. As days passed on Iniyan understood Rasathi with the help of Mangai and they both unite.

Now Iniyan's cousin sister also Maragatham daughter Punitha, falls in love with Rasathi's younger brother Kabilan. Punitha express her love in different ways but Kabilan has no interest in her also fearing that his love may spoil Rasathi's life. One day Punitha and Kabilan meet in a theme park and talk about their love. A group of political-party members see their discussion and assume both of them are lovers. So they ask them to get married on that spot. Punitha and Kabilan gets shocked and they refuse to marry. But the group of members took a weapon and compel Kabilan to marry her. So that Kabilan knotted the Mangalyam to Punitha and both married. As the gang moves form that place, both think of how their families will accept. so they decide to keep their marriage a secret. Eventually, Kanmani learns of their marriage and tells Maragatham. The whole family is shocked and Maragatham becomes angry at Kabilan and Rasathi because of this and she tells them to leave their house. But Iniyan supports Rasathi and tells to Maragatham that if Rasathi leaves, he will also accompany her. Maragatham is surprised that Iniyan is speaking to her this way. She says that if Punitha and Kabilan stay, then Rasathi and Iniyan need to leave. Paarivendan, Mangai and Nesamani try to prevent their departure, but Rasathi and Iniyan leave for Punitha and Kabilan's sake.

Cast

Main
 Ashwini Radhakrishna as Rasathi Iniyan, Iniyan's wife (2018–2021)
 Puvi Arasu as Iniyan, the Kabadi player (2019–2021) 
 Vasanth Vasi (2018) as Iniyan (replaced by Puvi)

Recurring

Cameos

Casting
The series is a family melodrama that airs on Zee Tamil HD. Newcomer Ashwini was cast in the female lead role of Rasathi, and fellow newcomer Vasanth Vasi was cast in the male lead role of Iniyan, later replaced by Puviarasu. While Prabhakaran Chandran, Subathira, Geetha and Azhagappan were also selected for pivotal roles.

Production
Due to COVID-19 pandemic situation Oru Oorla Oru Rajakumari and all other Zee Tamil serials stopped from 28 March. On 27 July all Zee Tamil serials resumed with fresh episodes.

Crossover episodes
This series had crossover the episodes called Maha Sangamam with "Sathya" from 3 August 2020 to 16 August 2020. This Sangamam garnered a top-five position in the most watched Tamil television programs of the week.

Again, this series had the crossover episodes called Maha Sangamam with Sathya for a second time from 9 January 2021 to 7 February 2021 with 30 episodes.

This series had the crossover episodes with Sembaruthi called Sadhanai Sangamam from 12 July 2021 to 31 July 2021.

References

External links 

 Oru Oorla Oru Rajakumari on ZEE5

Zee Tamil original programming
Tamil-language romance television series
2018 Tamil-language television series debuts
Tamil-language television shows
2021 Tamil-language television series endings
Tamil-language melodrama television series
Tamil-language television series based on Hindi-language television series